Associationism is the idea that mental processes operate by the association of one mental state with its successor states. It holds that all mental processes are made up of discrete psychological elements and their combinations, which are believed to be made up of sensations or simple feelings. In philosophy, this idea is viewed as the outcome of empiricism and sensationism. The concept encompasses a psychological theory as well as comprehensive philosophical foundation and scientific methodology.

History

Early history 
The idea is first recorded in Plato and Aristotle, especially with regard to the succession of memories. Particularly, the model is traced back to the Aristotelian notion that human memory encompasses all mental phenomena. The model was discussed in detail in the philosopher's work, Memory and Reminiscence. This view was widely embraced until the emergence of British associationism, which began with Thomas Hobbes.

Associationist School 
Members of the Associationist School, including John Locke, David Hume, David Hartley, Joseph Priestley, James Mill, John Stuart Mill, Alexander Bain, and Ivan Pavlov, asserted that the principle applied to all or most mental processes.

John Locke 
The phrase association of ideas was first used by John Locke in 1689 in Chapter 33 of An Essay Concerning Human Understanding entitled “Of the Association of Ideas″, he describes the ways that ideas can be connected to each other. He writes “Some of our ideas have a natural correspondence and connexion with one another”. Although he believed that some associations were natural and justified, he believed that others were illogical, causing errors in judgment. He also explains that one can associate some ideas together based on their education and culture, saying, “there is another connection of ideas wholly owing to chance or custom”. The term associationism later became more prominent in psychology and the psychologists that subscribed to the idea became known as the associationists. Locke's view that the mind and body are two aspects of the same unified phenomenon can be traced back to Aristotle's ideas on the subject.

David Hume 
In his 1740 book Treatise on Human Nature David Hume outlines three principles for ideas to be connected to each other: resemblance, continuity in time or place, and cause or effect. He argues that the mind uses these principles, rather than reason, to traverse from idea to idea. He writes “When the mind, therefore, passes from the idea or impression of one object to the idea or belief of another, it is not determined by reason, but by certain principles, which associate together the ideas of these objects, and unite them in the imagination.” These connections are formed in the mind by observation and experience. Hume does not believe that any of these associations are “necessary’ in a sense that ideas or object are truly connected, instead he sees them as mental tools used for creating a useful mental representation of the world.

Later members 
Later members of the school developed very specific principles elaborating how associations worked and even a physiological mechanism bearing no resemblance to modern neurophysiology.  For a fuller explanation of the intellectual history of associationism and the "Associationist School", see Association of Ideas.

Applications 
Associationism is often concerned with middle-level to higher-level mental processes such as learning. For instance, the thesis, antithesis, and synthesis are linked in one's mind through repetition so that they become inextricably associated with one another. Among the earliest experiments that tested the applications of associationism, involve Hermann Ebbinghaus' work. He was considered the first experimenter to apply the associationist principles systematically, and used himself as subject to study and quantify the relationship between rehearsal and recollection of material.

Some of the ideas of the Associationist School also anticipated the principles of conditioning and its use in behavioral psychology. Both classical conditioning and operant conditioning use positive and negative associations as means of conditioning.

Karatani's theory 
Kojin Karatani, a Japanese philosopher, refers to Hannah Arendt's remark about council communism (Soviet or Räte) that it does not emerge as a result of tradition or theory of revolutions, but "entirely spontaneously, each time as if it had never existed before", and that such a social construct is the same as what has been called socialism, communism, anarchism, etc., but because these names are cloying and misleading, he calls it X or associationism in his book.

See also 
 Calculus of relations
 Connectionism
 Family resemblance
 Prototype theory

Pocket Knife Brain versus Meatloaf brain Argument 
Lisa Feldman Barrett, a distinguished professor at Northeastern University, specialist in affective sciences, and author of the novel “Seven and A Half Lessons about the Brain”, uses a metaphor commonly known as the Pocket Knife Brain and the Meatloaf brain to develop a deeper argument to faculty psychology and associationism.  She interchangeably uses the pocket knife with faculty psychology to connect the two ideas together. She argues that every tool of the pocket knife has a specific purpose and cannot be used to facilitate the use of another tool. For instance, the knife and the mini scissors. Despite both of them being similar, both of these tools are ultimately used for completely different purposes as a knife cannot cut a paper in half like a scissor can. However, this is where the idea of associationism comes into play with the meatloaf brain, where all parts act in unison of each other.  This argument presents the theory that the mental processes are associated by whatever the person has previously associated it with.

For example, if someone were to say “summer”, one may associate it with hot, sunny, pool, relaxing, beach, drinks. It can only be done when there is a previous association with the word summer. Therefore, the meatloaf brain explains that since its structure is uniform then the use of different components is necessary just like if a person were to make a meatloaf, there isn’t just one type of meat in it. In addition, as Lisa argues in the book, a person who is originally coming from a Western background, the mind will have two features, thoughts and emotions. Having said that, according to her, these are two fundamentally different things. However, a person who is under the influence of Balinese culture, he might argue with the Western person that he does not think emotions and thoughts are different. From this person’s point of view, these two things are a single thing. This is an example in which explicitly demonstrates different basic features where ideologies clash. The way each person associates the features of the mind comes about in the upbringing of the person. The person from the West has formed an understanding that the mind has two distinct features whereas, the person from the Balinese culture understands it differently. A reason for this is due to associationism, the ability to associate one idea to a specific moment.

References

Further reading 
 
 Pre-History of Cognitive Science.
 

Theory of mind
Psychological theories
History of psychology
Socialism

ca:Ateneu Suecà del Socors